Toshio Masuda may refer to:

 Toshio Masuda (director), Japanese film director
 Toshio Masuda (composer), Japanese composer
 Toshio Masuda (politician), Japanese politician